Asher Allen (born January 22, 1988) is a former American football cornerback who played for three seasons in the National Football League (NFL) for the Minnesota Vikings. After playing college football for Georgia, he was drafted by the Vikings in the third round of the 2009 NFL Draft.

Professional career
Allen made his NFL debut in week 7 against the Pittsburgh Steelers due to an injury to starting cornerback Antoine Winfield. In the game, Allen made two key fourth quarter plays. He first made a touchdown-saving tackle on a kick return by Stefan Logan. Later in the drive he caused a fumble on Steelers quarterback Ben Roethlisberger, resulting in a fourth down. In week 11 against the Seattle Seahawks, Allen intercepted a pass from Matt Hasselbeck for his first NFL interception. He was placed on injured reserve at the end of the 2011 season due to a concussion. After three seasons of play, he announced his retirement from the NFL on May 30, 2012.

Personal
Allen is a cousin of former Dallas Cowboys wide receiver Michael Irvin. Allen is married and is a member of the Jehovah's Witnesses.

References

External links
Minnesota Vikings bio

1988 births
Living people
American football cornerbacks
Georgia Bulldogs football players
Minnesota Vikings players
Players of American football from Georgia (U.S. state)
People from Tucker, Georgia
Sportspeople from DeKalb County, Georgia
American Jehovah's Witnesses